The Children's Book Council of Australia (CBCA) is a not for profit organisation which aims to engage the community with literature for young Australians. The CBCA presents the annual Children's Book of the Year Awards to books of literary merit, recognising their contribution to Australian children's literature.

History
Lena Ruppert and Mary Townes Nyland, stationed in Australia with the U.S. Information Library, encouraged local teachers, librarians, booksellers and publishers to create a Children's Book Week in Australia, modelled on the annual event celebrated in the United States of America.

Children's Book Week
In 1945, Children's Book Week was held across Australia for the first time, with the theme of "United Through Books".

Awards

The Children's Book Council of Australia was founded in 1945 and the first Australian Children's Book of the Year Award was presented in 1946. At that time and until 1952, there was a single award category (now the CBCA Book of the Year: Older Readers Award).

In 1952 a category for the Picture Books was created, a Younger Readers category in 1982, the Eve Pownall Award for Non-Fiction in 1993, and the Early Childhood Award category was created in 2001, bringing the total number of categories to five. In 2019 the New Illustrator Award, formerly the Crichton Award for Children's Book Illustration, was added.

Funding
Initially the awards were funded through Government grants (1966–1988), and later by individual and corporation donations and sponsorships.  A major five-year partnership with the  Myer Group provided $50,000.00 per year. When this ceased the CBCA decided to establish the CBCA Awards Foundation. This was set up in 1996 and raised over one million dollars. Raylee Elliott Burns, National President and Chair of the 1996 AGM, said in her subsequent introduction to the Prospectus: "The advocacy role played by the Children's Book Council has helped to promote the literary experience for children and to assure the scope and vitality of writing and publishing for children in Australia… The Children's Book Council of Australia invites Australians everywhere to invest in the future of readers through the support of the CBCA Awards Foundation." Proceeds from investments now fund prizes for the awards in perpetuity. Benefactors (donations $20,000.00 and over) and Major Donors ($5000.00 and over) are permanently acknowledged on all printed and electronic matter emanating from the CBCA.

Organisational structure
The CBCA is a national organisation with branches in every state and territory of Australia. Some branches also have sub-branches. Branches are mostly autonomous, but generally adhere to guidelines set by the National Board. The National Board was established in 2012 and represents every branch of the CBCA. The Board is responsible for the annual Book of the Year Awards, plus the presentation of the prizes as well as Children's Book Week and the annual range of merchandise, as well as the online reviewing journal Reading Time and the biennial National Conferences.

Other CBCA Awards
 Dame Annabelle Rankin Award – presented for distinguished services to children's literature in Queensland.
 Nan Chauncy Award – a national biennial award presented to recognise a person's outstanding contribution to the field of children's literature in Australia.
 Crichton Award for Children's Book Illustration – an award to recognise new talent in the field of Australian children's book illustration (1988–2018).
 Leila St John Award – for services to children's literature in Victoria.
 Lady Cutler Award – presented for distinguished services to children's literature in NSW.

The National Centre for Australian Children's Literature

The National Centre for Australian Children's Literature (previously known as the Lu Rees Archives) is a comprehensive collection of  books and other resources about authors, illustrators, publishers and their creative works. The collection includes over 40,000 books, with some 4,000 of these in overseas translations in 58 languages, over 510 research files, and significant collections of authors', illustrators' and publishers' papers, manuscripts and artwork. The mission of the Centre is to enhance the appreciation of Australian children's literature by collecting, preserving and making available wide-ranging resources through programs, events and exhibitions. Lu Rees, the founding President of the ACT Branch of The Children's Book Council of Australia, proposed in 1974 that there should be a collection of research files about Australian children's authors and illustrators together with a collection of their books. In 1980 this collection was deposited at the University of Canberra Library so it could be publicly available. The Centre is an incorporated body in the ACT, with a Board which includes the Management Subcommittee and the Foundation Subcommittee. The collection was largely developed with donations from CBCA members.  In 1979, in response to the International Year of the Child, Lu Rees initiated a plan to collect overseas translated editions of Australian authors. "...one of the Librarians from the Canberra Public Library Service (CPLS) rang me and asked, 'What are you doing about the International Year of the Child?'... if I could throw in a personal idea, it would be to emphasise the ‘International’ and try to get foreign editions of our own authors' work in the children's field."

See also

List of CBCA Awards
List of Australian literary awards

References

External links
CBCA National website
Junior Judges Project
Lu Rees Archives of Australian Children's Literature
Reading Time
CBCA National Board on Facebook

Bibliography
 
 
 
 
 
 
 
 
 
 

 
Australian literature
Children's literature organizations